Jeyhoonak-e Paeen is a village in the Tamin Rural District of Mirjaveh County, which is in Sistan and Baluchestan Province, Iran.

In the 2006 census, its population was 47, in 9 families.

References

Populated places in Zahedan County